A convincing ground was the name or journalistic euphemism for a place where sports were contested, having limited currency in the nineteenth century, predominantly in Australia and New Zealand.

It has been used to describe a boxing arena in Australia, a social sports ground in 1891,  a cricket ground in New Zealand in 1862, and  a trotting track in New Zealand in 1904.

Two placenames in Australia retain the name: Convincing Ground Road at Karangi, New South Wales, and the Convincing Ground, a flat coastal area at Allestree near Portland, Victoria where a massacre of Aboriginal Gunditjmara people by whalers is thought to have occurred in 1833 or 1834.

References 

Australian English
New Zealand English
Sports venues in Australia
Sports venues in New Zealand